Shakala Shaka (Sanskrit: शाकल शाखा; IAST: Śākala Śākhā), is the oldest shakha (from skt. śākhā f. "branch" or "recension") of the Rigveda. The Śākala tradition is mainly followed in Maharashtra, Karnataka, Kerala, Odisha, Tamil Nadu and Uttar Pradesh. The Mahābhāṣya of Patanjali refers to 21 śākhās of the rigveda; however, according to Śaunaka's Caraṇa-vyuha there are five śākhās for the Rigveda, the Śākala, Bāṣkala, Aśvalayana, Śaṅkhāyana, and Māṇḍukāyana of which only the Śākala and Bāṣkala and very few of the Aśvalayana are now extant. The only complete recension of this text known today is of the Śākala School. As far as the Rigveda is concerned only Śākala Śākhā is preserved out of 21 which existed at one time. There is a claim that Śaṅkhāyana Śākhā is still known to a few Vedapathis in Uttar Pradesh and Gujarat but this is not certain.

The main saṃhitā for Śākala Sākhā is the Śākala Saṃhitā and the corresponding brahmana is Aitareya Brāhmaṇa. The main Upanishad of the Śākala Śākhā is Aitareya Upaniṣad. The Shrauta Sutra for Śākala Shākhā is Āśvalāyaṇa Śrauta Sūtra and the Grihya Sutra is Āśvalāyana Gr̥ya Sūtra. The Aranyaka of Śākala Śākhā is Aitareya Āraṇyaka.

Shiksha
Śikṣā as a term for phonetics, is first used in Taittirīya Upaniṣad, which gives its various components which include Varna (individual sounds) and Svara (accent). The Pratishakhyas are among the earlier texts of Shiksha. Pratiśākhya literally means " belonging to each śākhā". In the Rigveda the Pratishakhya available today is ascribed to Shaunaka. This is also known as Śākala Pratiśākhya and belongs to Śaiśirīya Śākhā, a branch of "Śākala Śākhā".

Prominent people
The major āchāryas who belonged to the Śākala Śākhā included:
Padmanabha Tirtha (samadhi 1324 CE), a Hindu Dvaita philosopher, dialectician, the direct disciple of Madhvacharya and the acharya who is known for spreading Tattvavada outside the Tulunadu region.
Jayatirtha (1345 – 1388) - a Hindu Dvaita philosopher, dialectician, polemicist and the 6th peetha of Madhvacharya Peetha.
 Eknath (1533–1599) - a Hindu Vaishnava saint, scholar, and religious poet of the Varkari Sampradaya
 Samarth Ramdas (1608–1681) - a Hindu Vaishnava saint and devotee of Lord Rama.
Mahipati (1715 - 1790), an 18th century Hindu Vaishnava Varkari saint.
Manik Prabhu (1817 - 1865) - a Hindu Advaita saint, philosopher, poet and guru of Dattatreya tradition.
Satyadhyana Tirtha (1872 - 1942) - a Hindu Dvaita philosopher-saint, scholar, yogi, mystic, theologian and the 38th peetadhipathi of Uttaradi Math.

References

Bibliography

 

Vedas